Brett Atkins (born 5 August 1964) is an Australian former professional rugby league footballer who played in the 1980s and 1990s.

Playing career

County Cup Final appearances
Brett Atkins played right-, i.e. number 12, (replaced by interchange/substitute Alan Shillito) in Castleford's 18-22 defeat by Hull Kingston Rovers in the 1985 Yorkshire County Cup Final during the 1985–86 season at Headingley Rugby Stadium, Leeds, on Sunday 27 October 1985, and played right-, (replaced by interchange/substitute Alan Shillito) and scored a try in the 31-24 victory over Hull F.C. in the 1986 Yorkshire County Cup Final during the 1986–87 season at Headingley Rugby Stadium, Leeds, on Saturday 11 October 1986.

References

External links

Memory Box Search at archive.castigersheritage.com

1964 births
Living people
Australian rugby league players
Canberra Raiders players
Castleford Tigers players
Manly Warringah Sea Eagles players
Parramatta Eels players
Place of birth missing (living people)
Rugby league second-rows
Rugby league wingers